The Honduran small-eared shrew (Cryptotis hondurensis) is a species of mammal in the family Soricidae. It is found in Honduras and possibly in El Salvador, Guatemala, and Nicaragua.

References

Sources
 

Cryptotis
Mammals of Central America
Taxonomy articles created by Polbot
Mammals described in 1992